Federalist No. 40 is an essay by James Madison, the fortieth of The Federalist Papers. It was published on January 18, 1788, under the pseudonym Publius, the name under which all The Federalist papers were published. This is the last of four papers by Madison examining the authority of the constitutional convention that had produced the proposed United States Constitution. It is titled "The Powers of the Convention to Form a Mixed Government Examined and Sustained".

External links 

 Text of The Federalist No. 40: congress.gov

1788 in American law
40
1788 essays
1788 in the United States